Hilma Sohvi Räsänen (28 March 1877 – 20 January 1955) was a Finnish educator and politician. A member of the Agrarian League, she was elected to Parliament in 1907 as one of the first group of female MPs. She remained an MP until the following year.

Biography
Räsänen was born in Kuopio in 1877. Between 1900 and 1907 she worked as a primary school teacher in Sippola, Kuopion maalaiskunta, Jämsä and Viipuri Province. She was also a speaker for the Temperance movement and the Naisasialiitto Unioni.

She contested the 1907 elections on the Agrarian League's list in East Vyborg and was one of 19 women elected to parliament. However, she lost her seat in the 1908 elections. During her time in parliament she sat on the Grand Committee.

After leaving parliament, she worked as a primary school teacher in Helsinki between 1908 and 1917, after which she became a writer. She also managed a women's rest home in Askola. She died in Vihti in 1955.

References

1877 births
1955 deaths
People from Kuopio
People from Kuopio Province (Grand Duchy of Finland)
Centre Party (Finland) politicians
Members of the Parliament of Finland (1907–08)
Finnish schoolteachers
Women members of the Parliament of Finland
20th-century Finnish women politicians
Finnish temperance activists